David Oleme (born 7 January 1952) is a Cameroonian boxer. He competed in the men's bantamweight event at the 1972 Summer Olympics.

References

1952 births
Living people
Cameroonian male boxers
Olympic boxers of Cameroon
Boxers at the 1972 Summer Olympics
Place of birth missing (living people)
Bantamweight boxers
20th-century Cameroonian people